Saṃsāra is a religious concept of reincarnation in Hinduism and other Indian religions.

Saṃsāra or Samsaram may also refer to:

 Saṃsāra (Buddhism), similar but distinct concept in Buddhism
 Saṃsāra (Jainism), cycle of births and deaths as per Jainism

Film and television 
 Samsaram (1950 film), a 1950 film directed by L. V. Prasad
 Samsaram (1951 film), the Tamil remake of Samsaram (1950)
 Samsaram (1975 film), a 1975 film produced and directed by T. Prakash Rao
 Samsaram (1988 film), a 1988 film directed by Relangi Narasimha Rao
 Samsara (1988 film), a 1988 film directed by Huang Jianxin
 Samsara: Death and Rebirth in Cambodia, a 1989 short documentary film directed by Ellen Bruno
 Samsara (2001 film), a 2001 film about a Buddhist monk's quest, directed by Pan Nalin
 Samsara (2011 film), a 2011 non-narrative documentary film directed by Ron Fricke
 Samsara (Red Dwarf), a 2016 TV series episode

Music 
 Samsara (album), a 2006 album by Yakuza
 "Samsara", a song from the 1981 Rupert Hine album Immunity
 "Samsara", a song by Parkway Drive, from their 2010 album Deep Blue
 "Samsara", a song by High on Fire, from their 2012 album De Vermis Mysteriis
 "Samsara", a song by Gris, from their 2013 album À L'Âme Enflammée, L'Âme Constellée...
 "Saṃsāra", a 2014 album by instrumental band Wide Eyes
 "Samsara 2015", a 2014 song by Martin Tungevaag

Other uses
 Samsara Foundation, Thailand
 Samsara (company), American technology company
 Samsara (perfume), created in 1989 by Jean-Paul Guerlain

See also
 Samskara (disambiguation)